The Embassy of the Democratic People's Republic of Korea in Madrid is the diplomatic mission of North Korea to Spain. In February 2001 Spain and North Korea established diplomatic relations. In 2003, plans to open a diplomatic mission were halted due to North Korea's withdrawal from Nuclear Non Proliferation Treaty. On 1 October 2013, Kim Hyok-chol became the first DPRK ambassador in Spain when his country opened its new embassy in Madrid. In September 2017 he was expelled as a persona non grata after a North Korean nuclear weapon's test on 3 September 2017. As of 2019, Yun Suk-so remains the highest ranking diplomatic official, with the title of Commercial Attaché.

See also 

 North Korean Embassy in Madrid raid
 Foreign relations of North Korea
 List of diplomatic missions of North Korea
 North Korea–Spain relations

References 

North Korea
Madrid
North Korea–Spain relations
Buildings and structures in Madrid